Nyang Mangpoje Shangnang (? – ?) was a general of the Tibetan Empire who served as Lönchen during Emperor Songtsen Gampo's reign.

The Tibetan emperor Namri Songtsen was assassinated in 618. The young prince Gampo Songtsen came to the throne, and appointed Mangpoje as his regent. At that time, Tibet faced rebellion in its vassal kingdoms. It proved that Mangpoje was an excellent leader. He quickly put down the rebellion, captured all the mutineer leaders and put them to death. Then, he led a number of men in an invasion of the Sumpa, defeated them with very few casualties, and forced them to surrender. Tibet began to collect taxes in Sumba, and Mangpoje had very high reputation in Tibet.

Songtsen realised Mangpoje could be a threat to his central authority. Another famous general, Khyungpo Pungse, notified this, sowed discord among them. Pungse told Mangpoje that Songtsen mean to purge him, persuaded him to return to his own castle sbu ba and refuse to go to the capital. Then Pungse spread rumors that Mangpoje plotted rebellion. Songtsen was taken in; he sank the sbu ba castle, captured Mangpoje, and had Mangpoje executed. His castle was torn down, and his position turned over to Gar Mangsham Sumnang.

References
Old Tibetan Chronicle, P.T. 1287

7th-century Tibetan people
People of the Tibetan Empire